The 2022 season was the seventh season in the existence of Kelantan United Football Club. The participated in Malaysia Premier League, Malaysia FA Cup and Malaysia Cup.

Coaching staff

Players

First-team squad

Transfers in

Transfers out

Statistics

Appearances and goals

|-
! colspan="18" style="background:#dcdcdc; text-align:center"| Goalkeepers

|-
! colspan="18" style="background:#dcdcdc; text-align:center"| Defenders

|-
! colspan="18" style="background:#dcdcdc; text-align:center"| Midfielders

|-
! colspan="18" style="background:#dcdcdc; text-align:center"| Forwards

|-
! colspan="18" style="background:#dcdcdc; text-align:center"| Players transferred out during the season
|-

Competitions

Malaysia Super League

Malaysia FA Cup

Malaysia Cup

Round of 16

References

2022
Kelantan United